Andreas Nottebohm, born in 1944, is an American/German artist whose work is associated with op art, visionary art, and space art.  He is considered one of the key innovators of metal painting.

Life

Born and raised in Eisenach, East Germany, he moved to Munich, West Germany, as a teenager.  From 1965 to 1969, he studied at the Academy of Fine Arts in Munich under surrealist painter Mac Zimmermann. In 1968, he studied etching at Johnny Friedlaender's workshop in Paris, France. From 1971 to 1974, he studied lithography in Salzburg, Austria. He returned to Munich in 1974.  During the early 1970s, he first experimented with using metal as a canvas by utilizing used etching plates for his paintings.
Nottebohm first visited the United States for a one-man exhibition in 1978. After traveling throughout the United States, he chose to make the San Francisco Bay Area his home.

Career

Andreas Nottebohm first visited the United States for a one-man show with Galerie Ernst Hilger [Vienna] at WASH-ART in Washington, D.C. in 1978.  Starting in 1981, NASA commissioned Nottebohm to create major works, including official paintings to commemorate the first launch of the Space Shuttle Columbia in 1981. 
His work has been featured in museums and galleries around the world including the permanent collections of the Crocker Art Museum in California, the Nevada Museum of Art, and the Air and Space Museum of the Smithsonian Institution.  He has had over one hundred one-man shows in Europe and the United States.

Critical assessment
 "These raw yet refined paintings on aluminum lend themselves to rich multi-layered metaphors capable of continual regeneration... Nottebohm will be seen as a pioneer in a field that has just begun to be mined." (askArt)
 "Nottebohm would have to be "hands down" the King of metal art. There are many artists using metal today, but Andreas' art has more than set the standard. He has raised the bar to the point that very few, if any who come after him, will ever achieve his success". (Sacramento Press)

Selected museums and collections 
Adonal Foyle, Oakland, California
Association of the Friends Haus der Kunst, Munich
Bell Atlantic
Crocker Art Museum, Sacramento, California
Embassy of Germany, Canberra, Australia
German Bundestag (Congress), Bonn
Geico
Hughes Aircraft
Iomega, Utah
iSearch Media, Inc., San Francisco, California
Karl Kreuzer, Germany
Kennedy Space Center, NASA Art Gallery
Museum of Modern Art, Rio de Janeiro
Nevada Museum of Art, Reno, Nevada
Collection of the Free Library of Philadelphia
City of Salzburg
Satellite Business Systems
Smithsonian Institution
, Schweinfurt
Stephen W. Hawking: Portfolio A Brief History of My Time

Selected productions and credits 
NASA 25th Anniversary CNN television special
"In the Stream of Stars", a Soviet-American space art book.
Painting "Dreams of Space" official poster of EXPO 86 World's Fair in Vancouver, British Columbia, Canada.
Painting "First Night Launch" used as center foldout by OMNI magazine for May 1986 issue dedicated to the memory of the Challenger Seven crew.
Lecture and slide show of photos from the launch of Columbia and paintings with astronomer Reinhard Breuer, from the Max Planck Institute
Article in Zoom Magazine on Space Shuttle Columbia launch and Closest Encounter with Saturn.
"Astropoeticon, Hommage a Pink Floyd", hardcover artbook with 39 original paintings and text by H.F. Franke

Current project

Nottebohm is currently completing a ten-year project with Pete Sears of Jefferson Starship, Hot Tuna, and Moonalice, which combines twelve pure metal artworks with twelve "out-on-the-edge" pieces of experimental music.

30-year retrospective

Nottebohm's first museum retrospective opened at the University of Arizona Art Museum, on May 28, 2011, and ran through September 2011.

References

External links
 
 
 Andreas Nottebohm At New Gallery Houston
 Artnet Website
 New Gallery Exhibitions
 Modernism website
 San Rafael Patch article "Phantasmagoria"
 Laura Rathe Fine Art Galleries, Dallas and Houston
 Wertheim Contemporary Art, Maui

1944 births
Space artists
NASA
Artists from California
Living people
Op art
German contemporary artists